Milan Doleček Jr. (born 18 March 1982 in Mělník) is a Czech rower. Along with Ondřej Synek he finished fifth in the men's double sculls at the 2004 Summer Olympics. At the 2008 Summer Olympics, he finished tenth in the men's quadruple sculls, along with Petr Vitásek, Jakub Hanák, and David Jirka.

References 
 
 
 

1982 births
Living people
Czech male rowers
People from Mělník
Rowers at the 2004 Summer Olympics
Rowers at the 2008 Summer Olympics
Olympic rowers of the Czech Republic
World Rowing Championships medalists for the Czech Republic
European Rowing Championships medalists
Sportspeople from the Central Bohemian Region